Opuntia fragilis, known by the common names brittle pricklypear and little prickly pear, is a prickly pear cactus native to much of western North America as well as some midwestern states such as Illinois, Iowa, Wisconsin and Michigan. It also occurs in several Canadian provinces. It is known from farther north than any other cactus, occurring at as far as 56°N latitude in British Columbia. There is an isolated and possibly genetically unique population in Eastern Ontario known as the "Kaladar population".

Description

Subspecies and varieties
Var. brachyarthra, Coult. A plant with more swollen joints, more numerous and stronger spines, smaller flowers and more spiny fruit Colorado, New Mexico. 
Var. caespitosa, Hort. Joints bright green, smaller and more crowded than in the type: flowers bright yellow. Colorado. 
 
Var. tuberiformis, Hort. Joints olive-green, bulbous-looking. Colorado.

Gallery

References

External links

Jepson Manual Treatment
Opuntia fragilis  Photo gallery
Opuntia fragilis photo gallery at Opuntia Web

fragilis
Cacti of Canada
Cacti of the United States
Flora of Western Canada
Flora of the Northwestern United States
Flora of the North-Central United States
Flora of the Southwestern United States
Flora of the Great Lakes region (North America)
Flora of the Great Plains (North America)
Flora of California
Flora of the Cascade Range
Flora of Michigan
Flora of New Mexico
Flora of Ontario
Flora of the Rocky Mountains
Flora of Texas
Plants described in 1819
Taxa named by Thomas Nuttall
Garden plants of North America